Chaqabol is a city in Lorestan Province, Iran.

Chaqabol or Chaqabal may also refer to:
Chaqabol, Borujerd, a village in Borujerd County, Lorestan Province, Iran
Chaqabal, Khorramabad, a village in Khorramabad County, Lorestan Province, Iran
Cheyabel, a village in Khorramabad County, Lorestan Province, Iran
Chaqabol, Selseleh, a village in Selseleh County, Lorestan Province, Iran